Felix Peselj (born December 19, 1990) is an Italian World Cup Nordic combined skier. His best result is a 41st place from Vikersund 2009.

References

Italian male Nordic combined skiers
1990 births
Living people
Place of birth missing (living people)
21st-century Italian people